Yakabindie is a pastoral lease, currently a cattle station and previously a sheep station, located about  north west of Leinster and  south of Wiluna in the Goldfields region of Western Australia,

About  of fencing was in place, most around one big paddock but one smaller sheep paddock had its own  fence.

The homestead was situated in Sir Samuel and had four large rooms, vestibule, kitchen, and bathroom constructed of wood and iron. The building was lined with stamped steel. The grazing land was described as typical Murchison country with plenty of mulga, saltbush and edible bushes suited for cattle.

When Adamson and partners acquired the station in 1920 it was running cattle but they introduced sheep in 1923 when they bought 2,000 ewes.

For the first clip in 1924, 3,300 sheep were shorn and with an estimated 500 stragglers to be mustered. About  of wool per sheep was obtained.

The station was still owned by Adamson in 1953 when he succeeded Sir Langlois Lefroy as President of the Pastoralists' Association of Western Australia.

Presently owned by a BHP Billiton group member, Nickel West, Yakabindie is one of six leases operated by the group. The area of the station is now  and runs approximately 1,200 droughtmaster cattle.

See also
List of ranches and stations

References

Homesteads in Western Australia
Pastoral leases in Western Australia
Goldfields-Esperance
Stations (Australian agriculture)